Aaron Hulme  (April 1886 – November 1933) was an English footballer. His regular position was at full back. He was born in Manchester. He played for Manchester United, Newton Heath Athletic, Colne, Oldham Athletic, and Nelson.

External links
MUFCInfo.com profile

1886 births
1933 deaths
English footballers
Association football defenders
Manchester United F.C. players
Oldham Athletic A.F.C. players
Nelson F.C. players
Hyde United F.C. players
St Helens Recreation F.C. players
Newton Heath Athletic F.C. players